Martín Manuel Calderón Gómez (born 1 March 1999) is a Spanish professional footballer who plays as a midfielder for Celta de Vigo B, on loan from Cádiz CF.

Club career

Real Madrid
Born in Jerez de la Frontera, Cádiz, Andalusia, Calderón joined Real Madrid's La Fábrica in 2013, from Sevilla FC. In July 2018, after finishing his formation, he was promoted to the reserves in Segunda División B.

Calderón made his senior debut with Castilla on 2 September 2018, coming on as a late substitute for Franchu in a 2–2 away draw against Atlético Madrid B. He scored his first senior goal on 21 December, netting the equalizer in a 2–1 home win over Rápido de Bouzas.

Paços de Ferreira (loan)
On 13 August 2020, Calderón joined Portuguese Primeira Liga side Paços de Ferreira on a one-year loan deal. He made his professional debut on 27 September, replacing Stephen Eustáquio late into a 2–0 home loss to Sporting CP.

Calderón featured rarely while on loan, playing only 171 minutes before returning to Real Madrid in June 2021.

Cádiz
On 27 July 2021, Calderón signed a three-year contract with La Liga side Cádiz CF. He made his top tier debut on 20 August, replacing Tomás Alarcón late into a 1–1 away draw against Real Betis.

On 6 January 2022, Calderón was loaned to CD Mirandés in Segunda División, for six months. On 31 August, he was loaned to RC Celta de Vigo's reserves for one year.

Honours
Spain U17
UEFA European Under-17 Championship runner-up: 2016

References

External links
Real Madrid profile

1999 births
Living people
Footballers from Jerez de la Frontera
Spanish footballers
Association football midfielders
La Liga players
Segunda División B players
Real Madrid Castilla footballers
Cádiz CF players
CD Mirandés footballers
Celta de Vigo B players
Primeira Liga players
F.C. Paços de Ferreira players
Spain youth international footballers
Spanish expatriate footballers
Spanish expatriate sportspeople in Portugal
Expatriate footballers in Portugal